The Coșei is a right tributary of the river Maja in Romania. It flows into the Maja in Bogdand.

References

Rivers of Romania
Rivers of Sălaj County
Rivers of Satu Mare County